Ochthera cuprilineata is a species of shore flies in the family Ephydridae.

Distribution
United States, West Indies, Neotropical.

References

Ephydridae
Insects described in 1896
Diptera of North America
Diptera of South America